The 1788–89 United States presidential election in New Hampshire took place between December 15, 1788 and January 10, 1789, as part of the 1788–89 United States presidential election to elect the first President. Voters chose five representatives, or electors to the Electoral College, who voted for President and Vice President.

New Hampshire unanimously voted for independent candidate and commander-in-chief of the Continental Army, George Washington. The total vote is composed of 5,909 for Federalist electors, all of whom were supportive of Washington.

Results

See also
 United States presidential elections in New Hampshire

References

New Hampshire
1789
1789 New Hampshire elections